Dr. Khalid Nassour is a superhero appearing in American comic books published by DC Comics, being the eighth character to adopt the Doctor Fate codename in mainstream comics. Created by writer Paul Levtiz and artist Sonny Liew to emphasize diversity and revitalize Doctor Fate's character in a new direction, Khalid originally debuted in Aquaman: Convergence #2 (July 2015) before headlining his own Doctor Fate series. He is notably DC Comics' first Muslim character to headline a solo series.

Born of Egyptian and White American descent, the character starts out as a medical student whose pharaoh lineage and contact with ancient Egyptian deities designates him as the next successor of Doctor Fate, a sorcerous legacy hero who defends Earth from supernatural threats. While guided by Nabu, ancient Egyptian deities, his great-uncle Kent Nelson, and Archangels, the character is portrayed as struggling with the dual life of a superhero as Nelson teaches and acts as Doctor Fate alongside his grand-nephew concurrently. Later, the character is portrayed as a reoccurring member of the Justice League Dark roster, officially succeeds Kent Nelson as the main incarnation of Doctor Fate before he is killed off. In more recent times, the character is portrayed as a member of the Justice Society of America and a medical school graduate.

The character would make his first media appearance in Young Justice, voiced by Usman Ally.

Publication history
After the conclusion of the Convergence limited series in June 2015 and the start of the "DC Rebirth" line, DC launched a new Doctor Fate ongoing series, written by Paul Levitz and drawn by Sonny Liew. The title focused on the newest Doctor Fate, an Egyptian-American medical student named Khalid Nassour. According to Levitz, Dan Didio and Jim Lee wanted a different feel from the original incarnation  when Gardner Fox created him during the Golden Age of Comic Books. Levitz said the Egyptian connection of the original is what fascinated him the most.

"So looking at the kinds of diversity we have today, and remembering a bunch of my conversations with Egyptian Americans, I just thought, what if a person who gets the helmet this time, in this world, is an Egyptian American young man?"

"And for a visual look, the guys really wanted something fresh - not the standard superhero approach that's been going on for the last few years. I liked Sonny Liew's work years ago on My Faith in Frankie, and ran into him in Singapore a few years ago when I got the chance to be the guest of honor at a convention there. And I've watched his work and stayed aware of it in the years since."

The series ran for 18 issues from June 2015 to November 2016. In the series, Khalid's origin story revolves around him coming to terms with his destiny to oppose the dark god Anubis, having been chosen by the Egyptian gods (Bastet notably) and Nabu himself as the next sorcerer in line to bear the mantle "Doctor Fate". Thrusted into conflict with Anubis, Khalid eventually embraces his destiny and pharaoh ancestry, defeating Anubis in the process and becoming the new Doctor Fate. The series also featured stories involving Khalid using his powers to defusing riots at the United Nations while balancing his life as a medical student. It is also revealed his mother, Elizabeth Nassour, to be the niece of Kent Nelson, who he becomes an apprentice under.

In 2018, DC launched a second Justice League Dark series written by James Tynion IV starring a new roster lead by Wonder Woman. In this roster, Khalid was revealed to be an eventual new member of the Justice League as the lead Doctor Fate instead of Kent Nelson. The character also was redesigned with a new Doctor Fate costume.

While the original 2018 series was cancelled in 2020, the Justice League Dark series was instead re-purposed as a backup issue to the mainstream Justice League title, the backup issue written by award-winning author Ram V featuring a new storyline with Khalid remaining a reoccurring member of the Justice League Dark subdivision. Khalid would also appear in several title crossovers such as Superman, Teen Titans Academy, and The Flash.

In late-2022, it was revealed that Khalid was slated to appear in the upcoming Justice of Society of America relaunch title, with Geoff Johns stating his role will include the exploration of the Doctor Fate as a legacy character while Khalid's story and role will act as a continuation of Ram V's Justice League Dark.

Fictional character biography

The New 52 / DC You

Doctor Fate (2015)

Origin: The Blood Price 
The son of an Egyptian physician turned taxi cab driver and an American archaeologist, Mohammed and Elizabeth Nassour respectively, Khalid is an Egyptian-American student graduate of Brooklyn College, having graduated with high honors and is set on going to medical school alongside his girlfriend. While looking for his girlfriend in the Brooklyn Museum, he comes across a statue of the ancient Egyptian deity, Bastet, and is presented the Helmet of Fate (called the Helm/Mask of Thoth in the story) though he initially rejects the artifact. Khalid soon discovers he possess magical powers while saving a child from mortal danger and encounters Bastet in the form of family pet, Puck, who bestows to him the helm, becoming Doctor Fate (called Fate in the story).. Khalid soon learns of the unnatural weather phenomenon being caused by the ancient Egyptian death god, Anubis, who had overstepped his cosmic duties and his role in blinding his Mohammed in a car accident, having targeted the Nassour bloodline for their connection to ancient pharaohs of old. While battling the supernatural occurrences caused by Anubis, Khalid also attempts to balance out his newfound life with his old life as a first year medical student. Eventually, Khalid battles with Anubis and loses before being dragged by the death god into the afterlife. While Anubis tries to damn Khalid's fate, Thoth appears to his defense and denounces his attempts at overstepping his bounds though Anubis attacks Thoth, gaining the upper-hand due to the ancient Egyptian religion having lost its worshippers, leaving other ancient deities of the pantheon with far lesser power. Thoth bestows Khalid his staff, allowing him to be reanimated once more and battle Anubis again. Drawing power from his blood, the power of his staff combined with his pharaoh blood making him a chosen priest of Atum, he is able to invoke power over Anubis and defeat him. Although the death god is defeated, he learns that this was only the beginning of his duties as Doctor Fate.

Doctor Fate: Prisoners of the Past & Fated Threads 
While balancing his newfound life as Doctor Fate and personal life, Khalid struggles with his lack of knowledge of the supernatural and the vague guidance of the Lord of Order, Nabu. It would late be revealed that Khalid's mother, Elizabeth, was the niece of Kent Nelson, making him his great-uncle. Khalid meets Nelson and discovers his past as the previous Doctor Fate, agreeing to mentor and tutor him into his newfound role while also simultaneously acting as Doctor Fate, having ascended to a level where he no longer needed to wear the artifacts associated with Doctor Fate to draw their power. The two of them would come into conflict with Osiris, who is behind the sudden resurrections of mummies and the Ghost of Julius Caesar during a protest in Egypt.

DC Rebirth

Justice League Dark (2017)

The Last Age of Magic 
Khalid would make a re-appearance years later in the Justice League Dark'''s "The Last Age of Magic" storyline; Still an apprentice to Kent Nelson, Khalid is revealed to have been imprisoned inside a vase while the Justice League Dark team go to speak to Nelson to learn more information about the Otherkind, supernatural creatures that feed on magic, and its connection to the newly made Tree of Wonder. When the vase is broken by Ragman, Khalid is momentarily freed from imprisonment long enough to warn some members of Justice League Dark that Nabu had hijacked his mentor's body for weeks and imprisoned him before the vase reconstructs itself, imprisoning Khalid once more.

 Lords of Order 
It is revealed through a series of flashbacks that prior to his imprisonment, he had witnessed an argument between Nabu and Nelson over the course of action to take with the re-emergence of the Tree of Wonder and the Otherkind. While trying to sleep, he hears and follows his mentor sleepwalking due to Nabu's actions of hijacking his body and making him don the helm. Following Nabu into the Realm of Order, he overhears Nabu and the other Lords of Order's plan to destroy the Sphere of the Gods, the origin point of magic in the universe, to starve out the Otherkind to death with the collateral effect of destroying all creatures and realms made up of magic, extinguishing them. He pleads with the Lords of Order to reconsider their plan. Nabu attempts to kill Khalid only for Nelson's body to intervene, his strength of will prohibiting Nabu from killing his grand-nephew.

After events of the Witching Hour, Man-Bat brings the vase containing Khalid back to JLD Headquarters, where he uses magic for the first time and performs a spell that frees Khalid from his imprisonment. Man-Bat and Khalid journey to Myraa where he allies himself with the resistance group lead by Blue Devil and Detective Chimp to fight Nabu and the other Lords of Order. As their efforts nearly fail, Wonder Woman and Zatanna arrives with newfound power given to them by Mordru, making them and other members of Justice League Dark Lords of Chaos temporarily, giving them the power to oppose the Lords of Order. In the ensuring battle, Khalid binds Nabu and gives Jason Blood time to use the Demon Three to free Nelson's body from Nabu's control. As the battle turns in favor to the Justice League Dark's team, Nabu fends off the forces alone. With the combined efforts of Khalid, Nelson, Blood, Phantom Stranger, and Zatanna, Nabu is imprisoned back into the helm, unable to permanent use his own power without the need of a host.

In the aftermath of the battle, Wonder Woman approaches Nelson on becoming a member of Justice League Dark as Doctor Fate, seeing the figure as a symbol of power despite Nabu's latest action against the magical community. Nelson rejects becoming Doctor Fate and although he recommends Khalid possibly being Doctor Fate, Khalid also rejects the idea. He and Nelson both agree to be a member of the Justice League Dark to act as wizard advisors behind the scenes while benching the Doctor Fate mantle due to the risks.

 The Witching War 
Now a member of Justice League Dark, Khalid along with the group come into conflict with the Injustice League Dark, the super-villain counterpart of their team led by a transformed Circe, having gathered the power of Hecate for herself, and enlisted other well known super-villains' of magical origin: Klarion the Witch Boy, Papa Midnite, Floronic Man, and Solomon Grundy. As Circe begins converting magical power sources to herself and rewriting the "rules of magic" and reality itself, the team struggles to battle Circe within her newfound power and allies, losing Swamp Thing in the process. As Circe's plan comes to fruition of hijackings Wonder Woman's body and enlisting Eclipso alongside her cause, Khalid dons the helmet once more and turns the tide of the battle, allowing Wonder Woman the opportunity to barter Circe to be imprisoned in her own world with the power of Hecate residing within Wonder Woman. Khalid permanently becomes the sole acting Doctor Fate, with Nabu moved by his host's words regarding his importance and agreed to cede all control of Doctor Fate to Khalid.

 A Costly Trick of Magic 
In the final storyline of the Justice League Dark title, Khalid is instrumental in helping the Justice League Dark restore order among the elemental forces of the DC Universe, re-convening a ritual known as the "Parliament of Life" which would balance out the elemental forces known as The Green, The Red, The Grey, and The Divided. While Nabu attempted to strong arm the representatives of the forces to no avail due to feeling as though humanity is doomed, Khalid counters their claims stating that humanity's very belief in them makes them. Later, Khalid alongside the Justice League Dark would battle the Upside Down Man, the leading force behind the Otherkind while having to believe their magic is able to defeat their foe. Khalid is incapacitated in the ensuing battle, causing Nelson to don the helm for a final time and sacrifice himself to unleash a spell powerful enough to hurt the Upside Down Man entity at the cost of his body. The effort is successful and eventually leads to Upside Down Man's defeat by Zatanna, who lets him absorb her and destroys the majority of his presence and imprison him inside of her in a far more weakened form. Although Upside-Down Man was defeated, the effort made left the Helm of Fate depleted of power, with Khalid unable to contact Nabu and tap into its previous powers.

 Infinite Frontier 

 Justice League (2018) backup & other stories (2020-2022) 
In the "Mythological" Superman storyline (taking place at some point prior to A Costly Trick of Magic storyline), Khalid appears as Doctor Fate and teams up with Superman to battle the supernatural entity known as Xanadoth, the reputed former ruler of the Lords of Chaos whose power and ambition was feared commonly by both the Lords of Order, Lords of Chaos, and the Lords of Eternal Balance. She is eventually defeated with the combined effort of Superman, Doctor Fate, and Nabu and is banished off the plane temporarily.

In the Teen Titans Academy "X Marks the Spot" storyline, it is revealed that one of the Teen Titans Academy student, Stitch, is actually Doctor Fate's newest apprentice whom had since enlisted into the academy to help her understand what it means to be a hero.

 Justice League Dark: The Great Wickedness (2022) 
In the Justice League Dark storyline, Khalid works to restore the Helmet of Fate's power, enlisting the scientific help of Kirk Langstrom. Their efforts offer limited success and a power to see into the future, Khalid seeing the Tower of Fate falling before a powerful wizard, whom is revealed to be DC Comic's version of Merlin. He also sees several other visions, learning of a woman from a different time known as Elnara Roshtu, also known as the Eternal Knight. A new entity has also inhabited the Helm of Fate in place of Nabu, whom is eventually revealed to be Hauhet, an Egyptian goddess and ally of Nabu whose presence in the helm disturbs Khalid from her more ambiguous intentions. The visions plaguing Khalid, granted by Hauhet, are occurrences that supposedly will precede the series of events depicted in DC Comic's Future State that will cause the fall of the Tower of Fate, Merlin's control of the magical forces of Earth, and the recruiting of powerful magicians such as Jason Blood, The Enchantress, and Arion as his subordinate magical knights.

Due to the manipulations of Yuga Khan, father of Darkseid, the normally heroic wizard is cast into a villainous role as he attempts to control the world of magic through a series of pawns and gambits of controlling magic. When Khalid and Justice League Dark find themselves pitted against Merlin, he proves to be a powerful and guile foe. During their hunt for him, they are assisted by other related magicians and warriors such as re-introduced character Randhir Singh, newly recruited Elnara Roshtu (Eternal Knight), Mister E, and Aquaman. Merlin works to re-trace the past sites of ancient Atlantis with intent of location the Atlantean font of power that allows him to draw into the magical reserve known as Darkworld, an extra-dimensional source of old Atlantean magic connected to the Great Darkness and the origin point of ancient Atlantean deities. While Justice League Dark assists Aquaman and the Silent School under the belief Merlin is attempting to control a form of magic considered untamable, the fulcrum of his plan is revealed that instead of seeking to control a force he knows he cannot control, he instead will control it through a mind controlled pawn with a natural connection to it long thought dead, a revived Arion. Justice League Dark and Atlantis suffer heavy losses as the team is forced to contain the threat of the Upside-Down Man, whose influence is revealed to linger inside Zatanna, and the damage created by Merlin's opening of Darkworld in Atlantis. With no strategy to effectively counter Merlin, Mister E appears and reveals to them of how Merlin's turn of evil came to be, having witnessed it backwards from outside space-time. Khalid and Zatanna would establish a secret pact with Mister E unbeknownst to the other Justice League Dark members, agreeing to trade in a portion of Merlin's soul containing his childish personality responsible for shaping him to being an eventual hero over his callous, cold front, for the magical artifact on Merlin's persons that would enable him to murder magicians. Reluctantly, Zatanna forges the pact in blood with Mister E, with Khalid cautious at the potential sacrifice.

 The Flash: Eclipsed (2022) 
In the Justice League Dark/Flash crossover storyline, Khalid teleports Wally into a dimension called the "Second Dimension" as the pair race to find a way to Gemworld by battling  demons while he and Flash are in a weakened state. The pair are able to survive due to Doctor Fate's magical powers allowing him to breaking the fourth wall, leading them to Gemworld, with members of Justice League Dark having awaited for Khalid and Flash with Amethyst. Unable to pursue Eclipso, Flash and the Justice League Dark team turn to Dark Opal for assistance despite his history as a criminal upon Amethyst's suggestion. It is then revealed that Flash is immune to Eclipso's influence, though the reasons are unknown. As the team are led by Dark Opal to Eclipso's whereabouts, the team comes under mind control of Eclipso, save Flash and Dark Opal. The two incapacitate the team and seemingly team up until Dark Opal betrays Flash to Eclipso to obtain his freedom. Flash is saved by both his children, whom sense his distress through the Speed Force and are able to transport themselves along with Animal Girl, the daughter of Animal Man. Dark Opal once more offers aid to the Flash, this time reasoning the fact that Eclipso is too dangerous. Using a magic glaive created in heaven, Flash uses it to defeat Eclipso while his children and Dark Opal hold off against members of Justice League Dark, including Doctor Fate. With Eclipso defeated, the Spectre reclaims the magical glaive and reveals to Wally that the immunity Doctor Fate mentioned was given to him by The Presence before Doctor Fate sends Wally, his children, and Animal Girl back to Earth.

 Justice League: Leagues of Chaos (2022) 
In the Justice League/Justice League Dark crossover, both Zatanna and Doctor Fate mysteriously receive premonitions of the future depicting Black Adam having destroyed the Justice League while under possession, a fact that worries the team. While they work to trace who is sending them the visions, the culprit (revealed to be Xanadoth) acts to make Black Adam her new vessel. Meanwhile, accompanied by Etrigan, Khalid calls upon Nabu, who reappears to him once more briefly to reveal Xanadoth to be whom sent the visions to Zatanna and Khalid while remarking that any interference from other Lords of Chaos and Order will serve to empower her and that he is unable to aid them. Shortly after, Khalid is contacted by Zatanna and Madame Xanadu and arrives to confront a Black Adam-controlled Xanadoth. However, all four heroes are defeated by Xanadoth, who claims the Helmet of Fate and kidnaps Madame Xanadu. After regaining consciousness, Khalid works with the rest of Justice League Dark and the Justice League to find a solution to defeating Xanadoth, the former team and Khalid deciding to forcibly summon Nabu on the physical plane. While implore him for questions, Nabu resists and eventually frees himself while taking Naomi, sensing her power to be of use. When Xanadu uses her magic to signal the Justice League, Khalid arrives alongside many other heroes, including John Constantine and Zatanna, and manages to retrieve his helm and exorcise Xanadoth from Black Adam with their combined might.  Xanadoth is ultimately defeated due to the Justice League and Justice League Dark's combined assault when Naomi's powers are revealed to heighten magic.

 Dark Crisis on Infinite Earths (2022) 
Khalid would appear in the Dark Crisis storyline as Doctor Fate, with Superman (Jon Kent) having previously urged him his magical powers to find the missing members of the Justice League. Unable to find them on any plane of existence, Superman concludes that the core members of the Justice League were killed. It is later revealed that Doctor Fate is among the members of the newly reformed Justice Society of America.

 DC Universe: Lazarus Planet (2022- 2023) 
In the prelude within the pages of Batman and Robin, it is revealed that the antagonist of the storyline, the Devil Nezha (loosely based upon the Chinese mythologyical entity) usurped the Helmet of Fate and plotted to use it to contain the powers of various magicians of the DC Universe to give him an edge against his adoptive son, Red Boy (who is known as King Fire Bull in the story). Eventually, the helm is broken in battle when it is later used by Batman, suffused with the arcane powers of many magic wielders, by Nezha and falls into the Lazarus Pit, causing a multitude of natural disasters and storms laced with the same chemicals within the Lazarus Pits as well as causing disruptions and fluctuations within people of both mystical and scientific-related powers. While the Helm of Fate is prominent, Khalid is notably absent from the story.

In the Lazarus Planet events and spin-off, Mary Marvel notes that nobody has been able to contact Doctor Fate. It is later revealed that Nezha had previously bested Khalid and trapped him within the subconscious of his own mind, where his subconscious self is met with Dreamer, who is seeking the Helm of Fate as her visions instructs her that it will be important in stopping Nezha. Unable to snap him back to reality, Dreamer speaks to Hauhet, who reveals that even without the helm, he maintains a deep connection to it but cannot be awaken until the Helm itself is also found.

 Dawn of DC 
Following the Dark Crisis of Infinite Earths and Lazarus Planet, various changes came to the character as his appearances in the Justice Society of America title acts as a continuation of his appearances in Ram V's Justice League Dark backup issues; despite Lazarus Planet  running concurrent to the Justice Society of America title (which preceded the event itself) and the character's status during the event, Justice Society of America establishes that the events within the book takes place some time after the events of Lazarus Planet. The character is also established to have completed medical school, having then began working as a intern doctor. 

The title similarly reveals the title's story takes place one year after the events of Khalid's Doctor Fate series, conflicting with James Tynion IV's 2017 run on Justice League Dark having previously established events onward to have taken place at least over one year after the series, the story mentioning the character having been trapped in a vase by Nabu (as revealed in the Lords of Order storyline) for much of that duration before being set free. This was also mention during Infinite Frontier in Brian Michael Bendis's Superman/Doctor Fate crossover in 2021.

 Justice Society of America: The New Golden Age (2022-2023) 
In The New Golden Age one-shot, Khalid had begun living in an apartment while working as an intern doctor and balanced his duties as Doctor Fate until he enlisted the assistance of Detective Chimp, whom had Khalid to resign from his internship for him without his permission, reasoning that his duties as Doctor Fate were more important. As Khalid is unsure of receiving assistance in the form of Deadman regarding understand the intentions of Hauhet, the new guiding patron of the Helmet of Fate, he receives a vision of the future and is warned by the aforementioned deity of an unknown assailant who is targeting various Doctor Fates before killing members of the Justice Society of America through various alternate timelines. This warning comes through other various Doctor Fates from the Helmet of Fate throughout various timelines, including a younger version of Kent Nelson. 

After her visit to 1940s, Helena Wayne from a possible future finds herself in the present where she finds herself in the company of Doctor Fate, Detective Chimp, and Deadman. There, as she explains her situation, Khalid receives visions explaining the origin of Per Degaton, who is revealed as the previously unknown assailant who is targeting members of the JSA by first killing the Doctor Fate of the timeline before killing the rest of the members. With questions on the time-travelling snow globe in her possession, it's connection to Doctor Fate, and why Catwoman of the future insist on Khalid being able to assist her despite being brought to him during a time where, Khalid makes Helena's existence known to the current JSA. As the team works to figure a plan to lure Degaton, he appears in their headquarters ready to kill them.

 Characterization 

 Heritage, personality, and appearance 
Unlike previous iterations of Doctor Fate, Paul Levitz created Khalid's character with an emphasis on Doctor Fate's Egyptian aspect by making the character bi-racial of both Egyptian and White American heritage Levitz's characterization with Khalid in the Doctor Fate series was intended to take inspiration from characters like Spider-Man and Doctor Strange (the latter whom Levitz collaborated with often throughout his career), being a young man thrusted with great responsibilities going through a journey of self-discovery in a world similar to the likes of Doctor Strange. While young, the character was emphasized to be a medical student and not college age, making him slightly older (expressed to be specifically around twenty-two years old during the Doctor Fate series).

During the Doctor Fate series, Sonny Liew also focused on expressing Khalid's heritage through his physical features (hair, nose shape, skin tone, etc.). Unlike standard superheroes, Khalid was also drawn with a more average physique compared to other superhero characters. Years after the series' cancellation, Khalid's appearance in other comic book series within DC Comics began depicting the character with a more toned appearance.

Sika A. Dogbovie-Mullins from Mixed-Race Superheroes opined that Khalid's rise to super heroics is not stemmed from his mixed race heritage but instead through virtue of his blood (through his father's side) and a "divine right of kings" and follows a Chosen One archetype. Unlike other American and Americanized superheroes like Batman or Superman, heroes who choose to fight truth, justice, and the American way, Khalid is chosen to fight for truth, justice, and the "(ancient) Egyptian ways".

 Relationship with Nabu 
During the 2015 Doctor Fate series, the relationship between Nabu and Khalid features several key differences from the Kent Nelson incarnation of the Doctor Fate character, with Sonny Liew intentionally changing Nabu's role from an overbearing presence to a guiding spirit more akin to a GPS system. Sonny also compared Nabu's role to Khalid within the helm more in comparison to the Marvel Cinematic Universe's version of J.A.R.V.I.S, the fictional artificial intelligence appearing the Iron Man and Avengers films. However, Nabu (stated to be a servant of Thoth) tends to be more vague due to his spiritual origins, requiring Khalid to figure out the workings of the Helmet of Fate (called the Helm of Thoth in the series) himself.

In other appearance after the Doctor Fate series, Nabu's role change slightly, as his character is no longer portrayed to be a servant to Thoth and is the prime patron of the Helmet of Fate. However, unlike Kent Nelson, Nabu reveals himself to favor Khalid (even when both stood opposing one another) and in higher regard than Kent Nelson, whom he tend to manipulate. Due to the events of Justice League Darks "Lords of Order" storyline, Nabu became unable to operate on his own without a bearer permanently. In the subsequent storyline, after Khalid chastises Nabu on the effects of his betrayal to his former allies, Khalid and Nabu reach an agreement in which Nabu cedes all of his power to Khalid while keeping his personal agency intact and acts more akin to the earlier depiction in the Doctor Fate series until his disappearance.

 Love interests 
In the Doctor Fate series, Shaya Halim served as the character's chief love interest, the two of them explicitly affectionate and planning a future with one another, both sharing the goal of becoming physicians. Khalid also is hinted to also have some feelings for his childhood best friend Akila, a Muslim activist who she encourages Khalid towards activism though she is unaware of his secret life as a mystical superhero. Although she has come to have feelings for Khalid, he seems unaware of it.

Powers and abilities
Initially, the character's version of Doctor Fate is considered not as powerful as those from other realities and continuities and was portrayed as a rudimentary sorcerer possessing a natural affinity for the magical arts due to his pharaoh bloodline, capable of potentially making him act as a counterbalance against deities, notably those from the Egyptian pantheon. His powers were portrayed to be derived from  either the Helm of Fate primarily or speaking simple phrases with intent.

Later portrayals of the character in the Justice League Dark second run onward elevated the character's skills under the tutelage of Kent Nelson, whose lessons makes Khalid into a formidable sorcerer and is described to be among the most powerful of sorcerers on Earth by his allies alongside fellow sorceress, Zatanna Zatara. His spell-casting skills is also portrayed differently, able to invoke both Egyptian related symbols and derived his abilities from the same systems of spells and magic used by the DC Comics' depiction of famous Arthurian wizard, Merlin. After the Costly Trick of Magic storyline, the character is unable to draw from the usual powers of the Helmet of Fate, the character having to rely mostly on his own magical powers and skills.

In addition to his sorcerous abilities, Khalid is knowledgeable in the occult and the workings of the universe from his training. Khalid is also a skilled physician, previously having been an emergency medical technician prior to becoming Doctor Fate and was a summa cum laude graduate of Brooklyn College. He is also proficient in hand-to-hand combat.

 Mystical artifacts 

 Helmet of Fate 
With Nabu as the patron entity, the Helmet of Fate bolstered Khalid's magical abilities and bestows to him the basic powers given to its bearers: flight, healing, control over the natural elements (wind, fire, earth, air) and lightning, and intangibility. Khalid also suspected that the Helm of Fate granted him increased intelligence. However, following the lost of the helm power during the battle with Upside-Down Man, Khalid became unable to tap into the powers typically associated with the magical artifact.

When the artifact later became inhabited by the Egyptian goddess, Hauhet, the helm's powers including making Khalid able to see glimpses of the future at a cost (due to its damaged state) and made him capable of being one of the few DC Comics characters able to break the fourth wall and grants others the ability to do so. The Future State event depicts the helm under Hauhet's power in a fully functional state, its complete power allowing the user to see the future and live through that timeline without consequence.

 Amulet of Anubis 
Called the Amulet of Thoth within his respective Doctor Fate series instead of the Amulet of Anubis, it is among Khalid's artifacts although its powers have not been explicitly used by Khalid. it is also commonly worn by him; the amulet was seen able to protect itself from being removed from him by others. As the Amulet of Anubis, Its classical depictions of its abilities includes an increase to the bearer's power, resistance to psychic/astral probing, mind control, calling upon the dead, and housing a pocket universe separate from the main universe.

 Staff of Power 
Unique to Khalid is the Staff of Power, bestowed to him by Thoth capable of controlling and projecting magical energy and is powered by his blood due to his Pharaoh lineage. The staff was given to him during his second battle with Anubis, allowing him power enough to challenge the god in his place of power and ultimately defeat him. He can call upon the staff or use its power by drawing his own blood, granting him enough power to damage gods (i.e. Anubis).

 Weaknesses and costs 
While possessing incredible power, Nassour's powers has some limitations; damage from beings possessing godly/divine forces are unable to be healed mystically even through the Helm of Fate's power. In addition, a "cost" to him possessing the powers of seeing the future through the Helm after being inhabited by Hauhet (while in a damaged state) takes some of his sight away.

 Supporting cast 
In the original Doctor Fate 2015 series features a small cast of characters whom have an influence on Khalid's personal life and his activities as a superhero:

 Mohammed Nassour - Khalid's Islamic and Egyptian father and former physician turned taxi driver, was born and raised in Egypt before moving to America after marrying his American wife and archaeologist. His father is aware of his endeavors as Doctor Fate, has knowledge of their family history, and supports his son in both his personal and superhero life as he yearns for him to be a physician, an opportunity Mohammed no longer has due to moving to the United States.
 Elizabeth Nassour (née Nelson) - Khalid's mother and Mohammed's wife. Like her uncle, Elizabeth became a well-known archaeologist. While initially unaware, she later learns of her son's double life and supports him.
 Kent Nelson: Khalid's grand uncle, mentor, and the original Doctor Fate. Nelson is also characterized as a strict and stern mentor, encouraging him to fix his own mistakes regardless of how he feels. Overtime, the two develop a deep familial bond.
 Nabu: The spirit inhabiting the Helm of Fate. Nabu is initially characterized as vague and cryptic in his teaching. Later characterizations in other titles depicts Nabu as a stern and abrasive mentor who is fond of Khalid though their relationship becomes strained for a time until he embraces him once more, ceding control of his power to Khalid unlike the previous Doctor Fate.
 Bastet: The fictional depiction of Egyptian Bastet often also serves as a figure of guidance, having chosen him to bear the mantle of Doctor Fate. While she initially questions her decisions in choosing him, she later comes to accept and deems Khalid worthy. Bastet also protects Khalid's personal life by intervening with her godly influences.
 Archangels: Khalid is also subtly guided by archangels whom are sometimes disguised as humans, their human guises having guided him both in his personal life and his troubles in regards to the conflicting role of Doctor Fate and his Islamic faith. The archangels are portrayed as working in tandem with the Egyptian pantheon, both angels and deities alike answering to the DC Comics' depiction of Allah, the character known as the Pressence.
Outside the Doctor Fate series, Khalid also has a few allies:

 Stitch: A magically animated ragdoll that identifies as non-binary, the character is a member of Teen Titans Academy and is revealed to be Khalid's apprentice. Stitch seems to view Khalid in a paternal manner.

 Enemies 
In the Doctor Fate series, Khalid faced a small number of villains:

 Anubis - The fictional depiction of the Egyptian god of the same name. Anubis seeks to ultimately supplant Osiris's position due to the waning devotion of the ancient Egyptian deities weakening his pantheon, a limitation that does not affect him. He targets the Nassour family due to their bloodline and relation to pharaohs of ancient Egypt, whose status as chosen priests of Atum makes them able to invoke influence over him. Julius Caesar - The fictional depiction of the Roman emperor of the same name; this version is a powerful spirit due to being declared a deity after his death, such an act empowering him in his afterlife. He comes into conflict with Khalid when his summoner, an unnamed Egyptian General who pilfers artifacts and practices magic, uses him and his powers to summon ancient spirits of fallen soldiers to quell protests. Khalid frees him from the General's control, allowing him to return to the afterlife.
 The General: An unnamed Egyptian general and necromancer with an interest in ancient Egyptian artifacts who revived the spirit of Julius Caesar using the dagger that killed him to compel him to do his bidding. Using Caesar and ghostly minions, he maintained power in Egypt through them and would use the spiritual forces against those whom protested his rule.  Eventually, he is defeated by Khalid after he frees Julius from his control.
 Clothorus: Known as the "Spinner of the Threads of Fate" and the "Worldweaver". she is ancient entity capable of controlling the destinies of others through both her powers and her minions, the dreamspinners. Claiming to have been an enemy of past incarnations of Doctor Fate, Khalid came into conflict with Clothorus and her dreamspinners when Khalid's friend, Akila, is fated to be killed by Clothorus. Clothorus is eventually defeated by Khalid and her base of operations is later destroyed.
Khalid also has significant enemies outside his series:

 Xanadoth': A powerful Lord of Chaos and their former ruler, Xanadoth targeted Khalid due to being the latest Doctor Fate possessing the Helm of Fate in her quest to drain the powers of the Lords of Order, fellow Lords of Chaos, and the Lords of Eternal Balance and establish her own "brand of chaos". Khalid would team up with Superman and Zatanna to seemingly banish the Chaos Lord. She would later return, fighting members of the Justice League and Justice League Dark, successfully stealing the Helm of Fate using the body of Black Adam as her vessel. With the help of Justice League Dark, Justice League, Nabu, and newcomer Namoi McDuffie, Xanadoth is defeated once more.

 Other versions 

 Future State 
An older version of Khalid appears within the Future State company-wide event in the Justice League Dark back-up stories of the Future State: Justice League series. Depicted several years after the events of the "Great Wickedness" storyline and the fall of the Tower of Fate at the hands of Merlin and Arion, Khalid is revealed to have disappeared from the world in search of a way to fix the Helm of Fate, damaged from the suicidal attack of Kent Nelson performed against Upside-Down Man during the  "A Costly Trick of Magic" storyline. Having found Hauhet, an ally of Nabu, she repaired the Helm and allowed him to see the future to understand how Merlin managed to recruit his "knights". He also lived through several alternate timelines in a vain attempt to find a future where they prove victorious against Merlin. Recognizing his current timeline as a future that ends in failure, he instead enforces a careful gambit, hiding himself from Merlin's view (whom seeks the Helm of Fate) until he is found by Etrigan. Revealing himself to his teammates years later, the Justice League Dark team alongside Doctor Fate against Merlin's forces and are overwhelmed by the combined might of Enchantress and Jason Blood, having been converted into one of his knights. Khalid then offers Merlin a deal to act as his oracle, the rogue wizard lacking the power to see the future. Accepting his deal, Khalid disappears with Merlin and his knights but not before revealing to Etrigan of his ability as a demon to perceive time different despite being part of a timeline where they are not victorious.

In other media
Khalid Nassour appears in the fourth season of Young Justice, voiced by Usman Ally. This version is a homo magi, protégé of Zatanna, and a member of her Sentinels of Magic. Additionally, he can perform magic by speaking his intent in a combination of Latin, Classical Greek, and Arabic. Over the course of his time as a Sentinel, he and his peers are tested as and would later become Doctor Fate as part of a rotational agreement between Nabu and Zatanna.

 Reception 
Jessica Plummer of Book Riot'' acknowledged the superhero and compared the likeness of the superhero to Marvel Comics Kamala Khan. While Khan is an original Muslim superhero, so is Khalid. "He's got a great design and is part of a demographic that is still woefully underrepresented in comics" according to her.

Collected editions

See also

References

External links

 Doctor Fate at the DC Database

Characters created by Gardner Fox
Characters created by James Robinson
Characters created by J. M. DeMatteis
Characters created by Steve Gerber
Comics characters introduced in 2015
DC Comics characters who use magic
DC Comics characters who can teleport
DC Comics characters with accelerated healing
DC Comics characters with superhuman strength
DC Comics male superheroes
DC Comics fantasy characters
DC Comics titles
DC Comics characters who have mental powers
DC Comics telekinetics
DC Comics telepaths
Egyptian superheroes
Fictional archaeologists
Fictional avatars
Fictional characters from parallel universes
Fictional characters who break the fourth wall
Fictional characters who can turn invisible
Fictional characters with dimensional travel abilities
Fictional characters with healing abilities
Fictional characters with elemental and environmental abilities
Fictional characters with fire or heat abilities
Fictional characters with air or wind abilities
Fictional characters with earth or stone abilities
Fictional characters with water abilities
Fictional characters with electric or magnetic abilities
Fictional characters with immortality
Fictional occult and psychic detectives
Fictional wizards
Muslim characters in comics
Muslim superheroes
Mythology in DC Comics
Superheroes who are adopted
Doctor Fate